Hampstead School is a historic school located at Hampstead, Carroll County, Maryland.  It is a two-story brick building with Tudor Revival stylistic elements, constructed in 1919 and expanded in 1939  It has a "U"-shape with a 1919 rectangular main block and an "L"-shaped rear addition constructed in 1939. It is a good example of centralized schools that Maryland's early-20th century school consolidation created. It housed students from first grade through high school until 1956. The property retains many of its outbuildings and is operated as an apartment building for adults 62 and over.

It was listed on the National Register of Historic Places in 2002.

References

External links
, including photo in 2006, at Maryland Historical Trust
The Residences at Hampstead School

Defunct schools in Maryland
Hampstead, Maryland
School buildings on the National Register of Historic Places in Maryland
Buildings and structures in Carroll County, Maryland
School buildings completed in 1919
National Register of Historic Places in Carroll County, Maryland
Tudor Revival architecture in Maryland
1919 establishments in Maryland